Polish Society of Arts and Sciences Abroad (PTNO) is a Polish learned society located in London in the Polish Social and Cultural Association building. It was established in 1948 and its aim is to represent and support members of Polish academia who live and work abroad.

Presidents
 Tadeusz Brzeski (1950–1958)
 Tadeusz Sulimirski (1958/1959)
 Władysław Folkierski (1959–1961)
 Bronisław Hełczyński (1961–1965)
 Jakub Rostowski (1965/1966)
 Bronisław Hełczyński (1966–1978),
 Tadeusz Sulimirski (1978–1980)
 Tymon Terlecki (1980/1981)
 Edward Szczepanik (1981–2003)
 Stanisław Portalski (2003–2011)
 Bolesław Indyk (2011–present)

Further reading
 
 Tadeusz Radzik, Sześćdziesiąt lat w służbie nauki. Polskie Towarzystwo Naukowe na Obczyźnie 1948-2008, Uniwersytet Marii Curie-Skłodowskiej w Lublinie. Presented at II Kongres Polskich Towarzystw Naukowych na Obczyźnie, 2008

External links
Official homepage

1948 establishments in the United Kingdom
Diaspora organisations based in London
Polish diaspora organizations
Learned societies of Poland